Borbo ferruginea, the ferruginous swift, ferrous swift or ferrous skipper, is a butterfly of the family Hesperiidae. It is found in southern and south-eastern Africa, in South Africa and from Mozambique to Kenya. In South Africa it is restricted to the lowland forests of KwaZulu-Natal. The habitat consists of coastal forests.

Their wingspan is 36–39 mm for males and 42–45 mm for females. Adults are probably on wing year-round, but it is more from October to May in southern Africa.

Subspecies
Borbo ferruginea ferruginea (eastern Kenya, Tanzania)
Borbo ferruginea dondo Evans, 1955 (KwaZulu-Natal to southern Mozambique and eastern Zimbabwe)

References

Butterflies described in 1925
Hesperiinae